Itna is an upazila of Kishoreganj District in the Division of Dhaka, Bangladesh.

History
In 1864, a police outpost was founded in the village of Badla, 6 km west of Itna Sadar. This outpost was disestablished on 15 June 1906 following the gazette notification 6676 which announced that a full-fledged thana (police station) would be established in Itna. Khwaja Hafizullah, founder of the Dhaka Nawab family, purchased some land in Itna Pargana. During the Bangladesh Liberation War of 1971, a number of people were killed in the village of Boira in Joysiddhi Union.

Geography

It has 23943 households and total area 401.94 km2.

Economy and tourism
There are many local mysteries about the construction of Itna Madhyagram Jame Masjid, which has gained the status of gayebi masjid and made it a place of attraction. The dargah of the five pirs in Mirdhahati as well as the Badshahi Mosque are also popular places in Itna.

Demographics
As of the 1991 Bangladesh census, Itna has a population of 132948. Males constitute 52.14% of the population, and females 47.86%. This Upazila's eighteen up population is 63852. Itna has an average literacy rate of 16% (7+ years), and the national average of 32.4% literate.

Administration
Itna Upazila is divided into nine union parishads: Badla, Baribari, Chuaganga, Dhanpur, Elongjuri, Itna, Joysiddhi, Mriga, and Raituti. The union parishads are subdivided into 93 mauzas and 116 villages.

List of chairmen

Notable people
Ataur Rahman Khan, politician

See also
Upazilas of Bangladesh
Districts of Bangladesh
Divisions of Bangladesh

References

Upazilas of Kishoreganj District